The Carl Ben Eielson House, a Queen Anne style house on 8th St. in Hatton, North Dakota, was built in 1900.  It has also been known as Osking House.  It was listed on the National Register of Historic Places in 1977.

It is an "outstanding" Queen Anne house but is most significant for its association with aviator Colonel Carl Benjamin Eielson (1897–1929).

References

Houses on the National Register of Historic Places in North Dakota
Queen Anne architecture in North Dakota
Houses completed in 1900
Houses in Traill County, North Dakota
National Register of Historic Places in Traill County, North Dakota
1900 establishments in North Dakota